It's Hard to Believe It: The Amazing World of Joe Meek is a compilation album of songs produced by English record producer Joe Meek and released in the 1960s. The album was released on 19 September 1995 on the Razor & Tie label, making it the first collection of Meek's music to be released in the United States. It was compiled and annotated by Dennis Diken, the drummer for the Smithereens, who first became interested in Meek's work through the song "Telstar", a song released by the Tornados in 1962 that Meek had written and produced. Diken told the Phoenix New Times Serene Dominic that he held a private party to celebrate the album's release, featuring a performance by a band whose members included Marshall Crenshaw and Richard Barone, as well as Diken himself.

Track listing

References

1995 compilation albums
Razor & Tie compilation albums
Albums produced by Joe Meek